Hippolytus of Rome (c. 170 – c. 235 AD) was one of the most important second-third century Christian theologians, whose provenance, identity and corpus remain elusive to scholars and historians. Suggested communities include Rome, Palestine, Egypt, Anatolia and other regions of the Middle East. The best historians of literature in the ancient church, including Eusebius of Caesarea and Jerome, openly confess they cannot name where Hippolytus the biblical commentator and theologian served in leadership. They had read his works but did not possess evidence of his community. Photios I of Constantinople describes him in his Bibliotheca (cod. 121) as a disciple of Irenaeus, who was said to be a disciple of Polycarp, and from the context of this passage it is supposed that he suggested that Hippolytus so styled himself. This assertion is doubtful. One older theory asserts he came into conflict with the popes of his time and seems to have headed a schismatic group as a rival to the bishop of Rome, thus becoming an antipope. In this view, he opposed the Roman Popes who softened the penitential system to accommodate the large number of new pagan converts. However, he was reconciled to the Church before he died as a martyr.

Starting in the fourth century, various legends arose about him, identifying him as a priest of the Novatianist schism or as a soldier converted by Saint Lawrence. He has also been confused with another martyr of the same name. Pope Pius IV identifies him as "Saint Hippolytus, Bishop of Pontus" who was martyred in the reign of Severus Alexander through his inscription on a statue found at the Church of Saint Lawrence in Rome and kept at the Vatican as photographed and published in Bunsen.

Life 
Little is known for certain about his community of origin. One Victorian theory suggested that as a presbyter of the church at Rome under Pope Zephyrinus (199–217 AD), Hippolytus was distinguished for his learning and eloquence. It was at this time that Origen, then a young man, heard him preach.

In this view, Hippolytus accused Pope Zephyrinus of modalism, the heresy which held that the names Father and Son are simply different names for the same subject. Hippolytus championed the Logos doctrine of the Greek apologists, most notably Justin Martyr, which distinguished the Father from the Logos ("Word"). An ethical conservative, he was scandalized when Pope Callixtus I (217–222 AD) extended absolution to Christians who had committed grave sins, such as adultery.

Some suggest Hippolytus himself advocated a pronounced rigorism. At this time, he seems to have allowed himself to be elected as a rival Bishop of Rome, and continued to attack Pope Urban I (222–230 AD) and Pope Pontian (230–235 AD). G. Salmon suggests that Hippolytus was the leader of the Greek-speaking Christians of Rome. Allen Brent sees the development of Roman house-churches into something akin to Greek philosophical schools gathered around a compelling teacher.

Also under this view: during the persecution at the time of Emperor Maximinus Thrax, Hippolytus and Pontian were exiled together in 235 to Sardinia, likely dying in the mines. It is quite probable that, before his death there, he was reconciled to the other party at Rome, for, under Pope Fabian (236–250 AD), his body and that of Pontian were brought to Rome. The so-called Chronography of 354 (more precisely, the Liberian Catalogue) reports that on August 13, probably in 236, the two bodies were interred in Rome, that of Hippolytus in a cemetery on the Via Tiburtina, his funeral being conducted by Justin the Confessor. This document indicates that, by about 255, Hippolytus was considered a martyr and gives him the rank of a priest, not of a bishop, an indication that before his death the schismatic was received again into the Church.

Legends 
The name Hippolytus appears in various hagiographical and martyrological sources of the early Church. The facts about the life of the writer Hippolytus, as opposed to other celebrated Christians who bore the name Hippolytus, were eventually lost in the West, perhaps partly because he wrote in Hellenic Greek. Pope Damasus I dedicated to a Hippolytus one of his famous epigrams, referring to a priest of the Novatianist schism, a view later forwarded by Prudentius in the 5th century in his "Passion of St Hippolytus". In the Passionals of the 7th and 8th centuries he is represented as a soldier converted by Saint Lawrence, a legend that long survived in the Roman Breviary. He was also confused with a martyr of the same name who was buried in Portus, of which city he was believed to have been a bishop, who was put to death by drowning in a deep well.

According to Prudentius' account, a martyr Hippolytus was dragged to death by wild horses, a striking parallel to the story of the mythological Hippolytus, who was dragged to death by wild horses at Athens.  He described the subterranean tomb of the saint and states that he saw there a picture representing Hippolytus' execution. He also confirms August 13 as the date on which a Hippolytus was celebrated but this again refers to the convert of Lawrence, as preserved in the Menaion of the Eastern Orthodox Church.

The latter account led to a Hippolytus being considered the patron saint of horses. During the Middle Ages, sick horses were brought to St Ippolyts, Hertfordshire, England, where a church is dedicated to him.

Writings 

Controversy surrounds the corpus of the writer Hippolytus. In the Victorian Era, scholars claimed his principal work to be the Refutation of all Heresies. Of its ten books, Book I was the most important. It was long known and was printed (with the title Philosophumena) among the works of Origen. Books II and III are lost, and Books IV–X were found, without the name of the author, in a monastery of Mount Athos in 1842. E. Miller published them in 1851 under the title Philosophumena, attributing them to Origen of Alexandria. Recent scholarship prefers to treat the text as the work of an unknown author, perhaps of Roman origin. 

In 1551 a marble statue of a seated figure (originally female, perhaps personifying one of the sciences) was purportedly found in the cemetery of the Via Tiburtina and was heavily restored. On the sides of the seat was carved a paschal cycle, and on the back the titles of numerous writings by Hippolytus. Many other works are listed by Eusebius of Caesarea and Jerome. The research of Guarducci showed the original statue was a representation of a female figure, reopening the question of its original purpose. Allen Brent analyzed the title list of the statue, questioning Hippolytan authorship of some works. 

Hippolytus' voluminous writings, which for variety of subject can be compared with those of Origen, embrace the spheres of exegesis, homiletics, apologetics and polemic, chronography, and ecclesiastical law. The Apostolic Tradition, if it is the work of Hippolytus, recorded the first liturgical reference to the Virgin Mary, as part of the ordination rite of a bishop.

Of exegetical works attributed to Hippolytus, the best preserved are the Commentary on the Prophet Daniel and the Commentary on the Song of Songs. This is the earliest attested Christian interpretation of the Song, covering only the first three chapters to Song 3:7.

The commentary on the Song of Songs survives in two Georgian manuscripts, a Greek epitome, a Paleo-Slavonic florilegium, and fragments in Armenian and Syriac as well as in many patristic quotations, especially in Ambrose of Milan's Exposition on Psalm 118 (119). It is generally regarded as an instruction relating to a post-Baptismal rite of anointing with oil as a symbol of receiving the Holy Spirit. The commentary was originally written as part of a mystagogy, an instruction for new Christians. Scholars have usually assumed the Commentary On the Song of Songs was originally composed for use during Easter, a season favored in the West for Baptism. Hippolytus supplied his commentary with a fully developed introduction known as the schema isagogicum, indicating his knowledge of the rhetorical conventions for teachers discussing classical works. He employs a common rhetorical trope, ekphrasis, using images on the walls or floors of Greco-Roman homes, and in the catacombs as paintings or mosaics. Origen felt that the Song should be reserved for the spiritually mature and that studying it might be harmful for the novice.

Scholars generally ascribe to Hippolytus a work now entitled the Apostolic Tradition, which contains the earliest known ritual of ordination. The influence of Hippolytus was felt chiefly through his works on chronography and ecclesiastical law. His chronicle of the world, a compilation embracing the whole period from the creation of the world up to the year 234, formed a basis for many chronographical works both in the East and West. It is from the Apostolic Tradition that the current words of episcopal ordination in the Catholic Church come from, as updated by Pope Paul VI.

In the great compilations of ecclesiastical law that arose in the East since the 3rd century, the Church Orders many canons were attributed to Hippolytus, for example in the Canons of Hippolytus or the Constitutions through Hippolytus. How much of this material is genuinely his, how much of it worked over, and how much of it wrongly attributed to him, can no longer be determined beyond dispute, however a great deal was incorporated into the Fetha Negest, which once served as the constitutional basis of law in Ethiopia — where he is still remembered as Abulides. During the early 20th century the work known as The Egyptian Church Order was identified as the Apostolic Tradition and attributed to Hippolytus; at present this attribution is hotly contested.

Differences in style and theology lead some scholars to conclude that some of the works attributed to Hippolytus actually derive from a second author. 

Two small but potentially important works, On the Twelve Apostles of Christ and On the Seventy Apostles of Christ, are often neglected because the manuscripts were lost during most of the church age and then found in Greece in the 19th century. . The two are included in an appendix to the works of Hippolytus in the voluminous collection of Early Church Fathers. The work on the 70 apostles is noteworthy as a (potentially) early source.

A consensus of scholarship agrees on a core of authentic texts composed by the second-third century writer Hippolytus, regardless of disputes concerning his community, or the exact dates of his biography: these are the biblical commentaries, including On Daniel, On David and Goliath, On the Song of Songs (partially extant), On the Blessings of Isaac and Jacob, and On the Antichrist. These form a sound basis for exploring and understanding his theology and biblical doctrines.

Eschatology
Hippolytus is an important figure in the development of Christian eschatology. In his biblical compendium and topical study On Christ and the Antichrist and in his Commentary on the Prophet Daniel Hippolytus gave his interpretation of the second advent of Christ.

With the onset of persecutions during the reign of Septimius Severus, many early Christian writers treated topics of apocalyptic eschatology. On Christ and the Antichrist is one of the earliest works. It is thought Hippolytus was generally influenced by Irenaeus. However, unlike Irenaeus, Hippolytus focuses on the meaning of prophecy for the Church in his own time. Of the dogmatic works, On Christ and the Antichrist survives in a complete state and was probably written about 202.

Hippolytus follows the long-established usage in interpreting Daniel's seventy prophetic weeks to be weeks of literal years. Hippolytus gave an explanation of Daniel's paralleling prophecies of chapters 2 and 7, which he, as with the other fathers, specifically relates to the Babylonians, Persians, Greeks, and Romans. His interpretation of events and their significance is Christological.

Hippolytus did not subscribe to the belief that the Second Coming was imminent. In his commentary on Daniel he criticizes those who predict the Second Coming in the near future, and then says that six thousand years must pass from Creation before the Second Coming. He also says that Christ was born 5500 years after Adam, so 500 years have to pass from the birth of Christ "to the consummation of the six thousand years, and in this way the end will be".

Feast days 
In the Eastern Orthodox Church, the feast day of St Hippolytus falls on August 13, which is also the Apodosis of the Feast of the Transfiguration. Because on the Apodosis the hymns of the Transfiguration are to be repeated, the feast of St. Hippolytus may be transferred to the day before or to some other convenient day. The Eastern Orthodox Church also celebrates the feast of "St Hippolytus Pope of Rome" on January 30, who may or may not be the same individual.

The Roman Catholic Church celebrates St Hippolytus jointly with St Pontian on August 13. The feast of Saint Hippolytus formerly celebrated on 22 August as one of the companions of Saint Timotheus was a duplicate of his 13 August feast and for that reason was deleted when the General Roman Calendar was revised in 1969. Earlier editions of the Roman Martyrology referred to the 22 August Hippolytus as Bishop of Porto. The Catholic Encyclopedia sees this as "connected with the confusion regarding the Roman presbyter resulting from the Acts of the Martyrs of Porto. It has not been ascertained whether the memory of the latter was localized at Porto merely in connection with the legend in Prudentius, without further foundation, or whether a person named Hippolytus was really martyred at Porto, and afterwards confounded in legend with Hippolytus of Rome." This opinion is shared by a Benedictine source.

Earlier editions of the Roman Martyrology also mentioned on 30 January a Hippolytus venerated at Antioch, but the details were borrowed from the story of Hippolytus of Rome. Modern editions of the Martyrology omit mention of this supposed Saint Hippolytus of Antioch.

See also 
Apostolic Tradition
Epistle to Diognetus
Canons of Hippolytus
Josephus's Discourse to the Greeks concerning Hades (actually by Hippolytus)
 Papal selection before 1059

Notes

References 
 Achelis, Hans Hippolytstudien (Leipzig, 1897)
Adhémar d'Ales, La Théologie de Saint Hippolyte (Paris, 1906). (G.K.)
Bunsen, Hippolytus and his Age (1852, 2nd ed., 1854; Ger. ed., 1853)

Döllinger, Hippolytus und Kallistus (Regensb. 1853; Eng. transl., Edinb., 1876)
Gerhard Ficker, Studien zur Hippolytfrage (Leipzig, 1893)

 Hippolytus, The Treatise on the Apostolic Tradition of St. Hippolytus of Rome, Bishop and Martyr. Trans Gregory Dix. (London: Alban Press, 1992)
J. B. Lightfoot, The Apostolic Fathers vol. i, part ii (London, 1889–1890).

Karl Johannes Neumann, Hippolytus von Rom in seiner Stellung zu Staat und Welt, part i (Leipzig, 1902)
 Schmidt, T.C. & Nicholas, N., The Chronicon of Hippolytus, second edition (English translation, rough draft), (2010).

Further reading 
Aragione, Gabriella, and Enrico Norelli (Eds) (2011) Des évêques, des écoles et des hérétiques. Actes du colloque international sur la Réfutation de toutes les hérésies, Genève, 13-14 juin 2008 Éditions du Zèbre, 2011

Handl, András (2021). “A Heavily Bearded Philosopher in Female Underwear. Deconstructing and Reconstructing the Identity of the ‘Hippolytus-Statue.’” Louvain Studies 44, no. 4: 340–64.

Hippolytus (2001). On the Apostolic Tradition: an English Version with Introd. and Commentary by Alistair Stewart-Sykes, in Popular Patristics Series. Crestwood, N.Y.: St. Vladimir's Seminary Press. 

Nautin, Pierre (1947). Hippolyte et Josipe. Contribution De La Litterature Chretienne Du Troisieme Siecle. Les Editions du Cerf

External links 

Refutation of All Heresies
Against Noetus
The Apostolic Tradition of Hippolytus of Rome
Ante Nicene Fathers Vol. 5: Fathers of the Third Century: Hippolytus, Cyprian, Caius, Novatian, Appendix
Hieromartyr Hippolytus the Pope of Rome (January 30) Orthodox icon and synaxarion
Encyclopædia Britannica, Hippolytus of Rome
Patron Saints Index: Hippolytus
Saint Hippolytus, Martyr at the Christian Iconography web site
Here Followeth the Life of St. Hyppolitus, Martyr from Caxton's translation of the Golden Legend
Colonnade Statue in St Peter's Square
 
 

170 births
235 deaths
Year of birth uncertain
2nd-century Romans
3rd-century antipopes
3rd-century apocalypticists
3rd-century Italian bishops
3rd-century Christian martyrs
3rd-century Romans
3rd-century Christian theologians
Ancient Christians involved in controversies
Christian anti-Gnosticism
Catholicism-related controversies
Church Fathers
Greek popes
Historians of the Catholic Church
Middle Platonists
Legendary Romans